Timbellus stenostoma is a species of sea snail, a marine gastropod mollusk in the family Muricidae, the murex snails or rock snails.

Description
The length of the shell attains 13.9 mm.

Distribution
This marine species is found off New Caledonia.

References

 Merle D., Garrigues B. & Pointier J.-P. (2011) Fossil and Recent Muricidae of the world. Part Muricinae. Hackenheim: Conchbooks. 648 pp. page(s): 133

External links
 Houart, R. (1991). Description of thirteen new species of Muricidae (Gastropoda) from Australia and the New Caledonian region, with range extensions to South Africa. Journal of the Malacological Society of Australia. 12: 35-55

Muricidae
Gastropods described in 1991